The Residence of the President of the Republic of Kazakhstan is a monument of architecture, history and culture, located in the former capital of Kazakhstan Almaty on Nursultan Nazarbayev Avenue.

History
The building was designed as a complex for the Lenin Museum. Due to political unrest in 1986, the construction of the facility was suspended. The building was 90% ready at that time.

In 1993, the construction was resumed, but the purpose of the building changed: it was continued to be built as a residence for the President of Kazakhstan. The construction was completed in 1995. After the capital of the country was moved to Astana, the building retained the status of a residence.

The area adjacent to the Residence is a traditional venue for pickets and protests.

In January of 2022, the building was stormed and set on fire by people protesting against the nation's rising fuel prices, resulting in most of the building largely destroyed.

Architecture 
The building was designed as a monumental structure, the large-span roof of which rests on four angular volume-structural supports. The spatial solution of the new residence gives maximum freedom to work with the architecture of the facades and flexibility of the internal multi-level planning structure.

The facade of the Residence is finished with white carrara marble, which is contrastingly combined with dark blue stained-glass windows, which gives the building a solemnity and formality.

The interiors of the building are decorated with Kazakh classical ornament, the motives of which are repeated in the organization of the internal space. The round dome of the Reception Hall is framed with a relief drawing based on the Kargalin diadem.

On the west side of the Residence, a park was laid out, in which there was a place for works of modern art.

Monumental status
On 16 October 2000, the Residence complex was included in the register of historical and cultural monuments of Kazakhstan of republican significance. The building is a subject of state protection.

See also
 Ak Orda Presidential Palace

References

Buildings and structures in Almaty
Presidential residences
Residential buildings completed in 1995